Eremiaphila cycloptera is a species of praying mantis native to Saudi Arabia.

See also
List of mantis genera and species

References

Eremiaphila
Invertebrates of the Arabian Peninsula
Insects described in 1939